is a former Japanese football player. His brother Masahiro Koga is also former footballer.

Playing career
Koga was born in Okawa on August 7, 1979. After graduating from high school, he joined the J1 League club Yokohama Marinos (later Yokohama F. Marinos) in 1998. Although, he played several matches as an offensive midfielder every season, he did not play in many matches. In 2002, he moved to the J2 League club Avispa Fukuoka based in his local area. He played many matches as left offensive midfielder and the club was promoted to J1 in 2006. However the club was relegated to J2 in a year and his opportunity to play decreased in 2007. He became a regular player and played often until May 2008. After that, he could not play due to an injury. Although he came back in July 2009, he was released from the club at the end of the 2009 season. In May 2010, he joined the Prefectural Leagues club SC Sagamihara. He played often and the club was promoted to the Regional Leagues in 2011. He retired at the end of the 2012 season.

Club statistics

References

External links

1979 births
Living people
Association football people from Fukuoka Prefecture
Japanese footballers
J1 League players
J2 League players
Yokohama F. Marinos players
Avispa Fukuoka players
Vissel Kobe players
SC Sagamihara players
Footballers at the 1998 Asian Games
Association football midfielders
Asian Games competitors for Japan